The 1970–71 Minnesota North Stars season was the North Stars' fourth season.

Coached by Jack Gordon, the team compiled a record of 28–34–16 for 72 points, to finish the regular season 4th in the West Division. In the playoffs they won the quarter-finals 4–2 over the St. Louis Blues, but lost the semi-finals 4–2 to the Montreal Canadiens.

Offseason

Regular season

Final standings

Schedule and results

Playoffs
For the third time in four seasons, the North Stars played the Blues. This time, the North Stars gained the upper hand and won over the Blues after winning three in a row.

Stanley Cup Quarterfinals

North Stars win series 4–2

This was the first series played between the Canadiens and the North Stars. Their win on April 24 was the first win by a member of the expansion squad against the original teams in the playoffs.

Stanley Cup Semifinals

North Stars lose series 4–2

Player statistics

Awards and records

Transactions

Draft picks
Minnesota's draft picks at the 1970 NHL Amateur Draft held at the Queen Elizabeth Hotel in Montreal, Quebec.

Farm teams

See also
1970–71 NHL season

References

External links
 

Minnesota
Minnesota
Minnesota North Stars seasons
Minnesota North Stars
Minnesota North Stars